Gǁana (pronounced  in English, and also spelled ǁGana, Gxana, Dxana, Xgana) is a Khoe dialect cluster of Botswana.  It is closely related to Naro, and includes the well-known dialect Gǀwi, which has the majority of speakers.

The double pipe at the beginning of the name "Gǁana" represents a click like the English interjection used when saying giddy-ap to a horse. For the clicks and other sounds found in Gǁana, see Gǀwi dialect.

Dialects
Gǀwi
Domkhoe
Gǁaa(khwe)
Kǀhessákhoe

References

Sources
 Brenzinger, Matthias (2011) "The twelve modern Khoisan languages." In Witzlack-Makarevich & Ernszt (eds.), Khoisan languages and linguistics: proceedings of the 3rd International Symposium, Riezlern / Kleinwalsertal (Research in Khoisan Studies 29). Cologne: Rüdiger Köppe Verlag.

External links
Gǁana basic lexicon at the Global Lexicostatistical Database

Khoe languages
Languages of Botswana